Estadio Betero is a sports and leisure venue located in Valencia, in Spain. It is currently mainly used for field hockey matches and matches organized for major competitions.

In the past, the stadium has hosted the following major tournaments:
 2012–13 Men's FIH Hockey World League Round 2 - 25 February – 3 March 2013
 2014–15 Men's FIH Hockey World League Semifinals - 10 – 21 June 2015
 2016–17 Men's FIH Hockey World League Round 2 - 4 – 12 February 2017
 2019 Men's FIH Pro League - 19 January – 15 March 2019
 2020–21 Men's FIH Pro League - 24 January 2020 – 6 February 2021
 2021–22 Men's FIH Pro League - 4 February – 18 May 2022
 2022 Women's FIH Hockey Nations Cup - 10 – 17 December 2022

Its location is Carrer de Campillo de Altobuey, 1 in Valencia.

References

External links 
 
 

Multi-purpose stadiums in Spain
Field hockey venues in Spain